St Leonards is a suburb on the lower North Shore of Sydney, in the state of New South Wales, Australia.

History
St Leonards was named after English statesman Viscount Sydney of St Leonards. Originally, St Leonards applied to the whole area from the present suburb of North Sydney to Gore Hill. The township of St Leonards in 1883 is now North Sydney.

The oldest railway station on the North Shore line opened in 1890 in St Leonards and originally only ran to Hornsby.

The Gore Hill cemetery was established on the Pacific Highway in 1868 and was the main burial site for the area until its closure in 1975. It is still maintained as a heritage site by the Department of Local Government and Lands, Willoughby Municipal Council and the Heritage Council of New South Wales.

Heritage listings 
St Leonards has a number of heritage-listed sites, including:

 Pacific Highway: Gore Hill Memorial Cemetery

Population
In the 2016 Census, there were 5,495 people in St Leonards. 34.7% of people were born in Australia. The next most common countries of birth were China 8.6%, India 6.0%, Japan 4.5%, Hong Kong 4.4% and England 3.8%. 45.7% of people spoke only English at home. Other languages spoken at home included Mandarin 10.3%, Cantonese 7.7%, Japanese 4.7%, Hindi 3.1% and Korean 2.3%. The most common responses for religion were No Religion 40.3% and Catholic 16.2%.

Commercial area

St Leonards has a commercial centre that complements the role of Chatswood, Lane Cove and North Sydney as one of the centres for business on the North Shore of Sydney. St Leonards contains one of Sydney's suburban skyscraper clusters, with major offices for many large companies including Toyota Financial Services, Lenovo, Oporto Chicken & Burgers, Manchester Unity, 3, Savvytel, CIMIC Group, Macquarie Radio Network and Channel 31 TV studio. The NSW Department of Education and Training host their Information Technology Directorate in Herbert Street. Gore Hill Technology Park is the site of current Fox Sports television studios. IBM had a large office with their logo on the skyscraper but have since moved to Sydney's CBD since 2018.

The Forum

The Forum is built over the railway station and comprises three commercial office buildings, two residential towers containing 782 apartments, an independent mini-supermarket, and 34 food and retail shops.

Forum Tower (118m/38 stories) was the suburb's first high-rise apartment building complex completed in August 1999 and Forum West 3 three years later. Both buildings boast a concierge, pool, spa, gym and private & public car parking facilities each. Winten Property Group was responsible for the construction of both Forum buildings.

The Plaza also contains offices for Cisco Systems, Verizon Business, Getty Images among other companies.

Transport

St Leonards railway station is on the North Shore & Western Line of the Sydney Trains network. The Pacific Highway is the major road through the suburb.

Health

A major landuse in the suburb is the Royal North Shore Hospital which is the largest hospital north of Port Jackson (Sydney Harbour) in Sydney.

Schools and churches
A campus of the University of Technology, Sydney
The campus of Northern Sydney TAFE
Northside Community Church
Royal North Shore Hospital Chapel

Sport and recreation
St Leonards has developed into somewhat of a home for rugby union with the former headquarters of the Australian Rugby Union located at St Leonards (2007-2018), from neighbouring North Sydney. The Northern Suburbs Rugby Club has its clubhouse in St Leonards, featuring the Cabana Bar and Lounge. It also has a popular Rock Climbing Facility for the climbing community.

Gore Hill Oval, located on the grounds of Royal North Shore Hospital, is a synthetic field for AFL & cricket, ½ basketball court, handball courts, perimeter walking track, 2 exercise equipment stations and a playground. It is also the home ground of Australian rules football club, North Shore Bombers.

References

External links

 Willoughby City Council
 St Leonards - community profile

 
Suburbs of Sydney
1853 establishments in Australia
City of Willoughby
Lane Cove Council
North Sydney Council